Alfred Yaghobzadeh, is an Iranian photographer of Assyrian descent who is noted for his war photography.

Early life and career 
Yaghobzadeh was born in Tehran, to an Armenian-Assyrian family. His photographs in Iran during the 1979 Iranian Revolution and during the Iran–Iraq War led to his work for the Associated Press, Gamma, and Sygma news agencies. Since 1983 Yaghobzadeh has photographed for the Sipa Press. and his photos have also appeared in Time, Newsweek, Stern, Paris Match, El País and GEO.

Yaghobzadeh has covered armed conflicts and wars in Cuba, Uzbekistan, Afghanistan, Somalia, the Israeli–Palestinian conflict and the Lebanese Civil War. In Lebanon, he was wounded and taken hostage, and in Chechnya he was wounded by a tank shell.

In 2006, Yaghobzadeh and French journalist Caroline Laurent were kidnapped by a Palestinian faction while they were working in Gaza on a story about the lives of Palestinian women for the French magazine Elle.

Yaghobzadeh has also explored the release of repressed Christianity in Eastern Europe following the collapse of communism. Published as Christianity around the World, Yaghobzadeh documented religious rites and rituals in 24 countries over the course of a decade.

Yaghobzadeh has published three photo books: War Iran-Iraq, Faces of War and Promised Peace. He has also won several prestigious photograph awards  including the prize from the World Press Photo and the American Overseas Press Club.

Yaghobzadeh was injured while covering the Egyptian Revolution of 2011.

See also
 Culture of Iran
Hassan Jangju
 Islamic art
 Iranian art
 Iranian art and architecture
 List of Iranian artists
 List of iconic photographs

References

 Behind the Scenes: In a Holy City

External links
 Yaghobzadeh's site
 Yaghobzadeh at Sipa Press
 YouTube - Iranian photographer

Iranian photojournalists
Iranian Assyrian people
Iranian people of Armenian descent
Year of birth missing (living people)
Living people
People from Tehran
War photographers
Armenian journalists
Armenian male writers